Sarmatia Asiatica ("Asiatic Sarmatia") was the name used in Ptolemy's Geography (ca. 150) for a part of "Sarmatia", a large region which included parts of Europe and Asia. Another part was Sarmatia Europea ("European Sarmatia"), which was situated further west. European Sarmatia largely corresponds to what was later known as Grand Duchy of Lithuania; later, Intermarium; and nowadays the Three Seas Initiative. Sarmatia was present in most maps of the region from the time of Ptolemy until the end of the 18th century.

Maciej Miechowita (1457–1523) used "Sarmatia" for the Black Sea region and further divided it into Sarmatia Europea, which included East Central Europe, and Sarmatia Asiatica. Filippo Ferrari (1551–1626) also divided the two.

Sarmatia Asiatica
In modern times, geographers had various views on its extent:

S. A. Mitchell (1860) described it as bordering an unknown country in the north, Scythia and Caspian Sea in the east, the Caucasus in the south, and Cimmerian Bosphorus, Palus Maeotis and Tanais in the west. It included the mountains of Coraxici, Hippici and Hyperborei (the Ural), and rivers Don, Kuban and Volga.
A. Arrowsmith (1832): 
A. Picquot (1826) described it as bordering Scythia and the Roxolani to the north, Caspian Sea to the east, Colchis, Albania and Iberia to the south, and Palus Maeotis and Cimmerian Bosphorus to the west.

Sarmatia Europea
A. Arrowsmith (1832):

See also

Sarmatism

References

Sources

Classical geography
Scythia